OGEL may refer to:

 Oil, Gas and Energy Law, an academic journal
 Open general export licence, a licence permitting low-risk exports
 Olivier Giscard d'Estaing Library in Kazakstan's KIMEP University
 Ogel, fictional character from Lego Alpha Team themed sets and games